The Memorial to the Brigade of Gurkhas on Horse Guards Avenue, Whitehall, London, was unveiled by Queen Elizabeth II on 3 December 1997. This was the first memorial to Gurkha soldiers in the United Kingdom, and was occasioned by transfer of their headquarters and training  centre from Hong Kong to London in 1997. The sculptor was Philip Jackson, working from a statue of 1924 by Richard Reginald Goulden in the Foreign and Commonwealth Office, and the plinth was designed by Cecil Denny Highton.

Two casts of Goulden's sculpture had previously been erected in locations in Nepal as World War I memorials to the Gurkhas, the first at Kunraghat in 1928 and the second at Birpur in 1930. The memorial in London is more than one and a half times the size of this model, so Jackson worked the figure up in his own style and from a living model, Captain Khemkumar Limbu. One of several inscriptions on the plinth is a quotation from Sir Ralph Lilley Turner, a former officer in the 3rd Gurkha Rifles.

Inscriptions

1st King George V's Own Gurkha Riflles
(The Malaun Regiment)
2nd King Edward VII's Own Gurkha Rifles
(The Sirmoor Rifles)
3rd Queen Alexandra's Own Gurkha Rifles
4th Prince of Wales's Own Gurkha Rifles
5th Royal Gurkha Rifles (Frontier Force)
6th Queen Elizabeth's Own Gurkha Rifles
7th Duke of Edinburgh's Own Gurkha Rifles
8th Gurkha Rifles9th Gurkha Rifles
10th Princess Mary's Own Gurkha Rifles
11th Gurkha Rifles
The Royal Gurkha Rifles
The Queen's Gurkha Engineers
Queen's Gurkha Signals
Gurkha Military Police
The Queen's Own Gurkha Transport Regiment

Other units in which Gurkha soldiers served after 1815
and also the units of the Royal Nepalese Army
which, as Britain's allies, took part in the Indian Mutiny
and the First and Second World Wars.

India 1816–1826
North East Frontier and Burma 1824–1939
First Sikh War 1845–1846
North West Frontier 1852–1947
Indian Mutiny 1857–1859
Bhutan 1864–1866
Malaya 1875–1876
Second Afghan War 1878–1880
Sikkim 1888
China 1900
Tibet 1904
Third Afghan War 1919
Kurdustan 1919
Iraq 1919–1920
North West Persia 1920
Malabar 1921–1922
Palestine 1945–1946
Java and Sumatra 1945–1946
Indo-China 1945–1946
Malaya 1948–1960
Brunei 1962
Borneo 1963–1966
Malay Peninsula 1964–1965
Falkland Islands 1982
The Gulf 1990–1991
Bosnia 1996

FIRST WORLD WAR
1914–1918
France and Belgium
Gallipoli
Egypt and Palestine
Mesopotamia

SECOND WORLD WAR
1939–1945
North Africa
Italy
Greece
Persia, Iraq and Syria
Malaya and Singapore
Burma

See also
 1997 in art
 Brigade of Gurkhas

References

External links

 The Gurkhas – Britain's oldest allies (December 4, 1997), BBC News
 Statue: Gurkha soldier at London Remembers
 The Gurkha Soldier Memorial – Horse Guards Avenue, London, UK at Waymarking

1997 establishments in the United Kingdom
1997 sculptures
Gurkhas
Military memorials in London
Outdoor sculptures in London
Statues in the City of Westminster
Whitehall